Maaza Mengiste (born 1974) is an Ethiopian-American writer. Her novels include Beneath the Lion's Gaze (2010) and The Shadow King (2019), which was shortlisted for the 2020 Booker Prize.

Early life
Mengiste was born in Addis Ababa, Ethiopia, but left the country at the age of four when her family fled the Ethiopian Revolution. She spent the rest of her childhood in Nigeria, Kenya, and the United States. She later studied in Italy as a Fulbright Scholar and earned an MFA degree in creative writing from New York University.

Career
Mengiste has published fiction and nonfiction dealing with migration, the Ethiopian revolution, and the plight of sub-Saharan immigrants arriving in Europe.  Her work has appeared in The New York Times, The New Yorker, Granta, Lettre Internationale, Enkare Review,  Callaloo, The Granta Anthology of the African Short Story (edited by Helon Habila), New Daughters of Africa (edited by Margaret Busby),
and has been broadcast on BBC Radio 4.

Mengiste's 2010 debut novel Beneath the Lion's Gaze – the story of a family struggling to survive the tumultuous and bloody years of the Ethiopian Revolution – was named one of the 10 best contemporary African books by The Guardian and has been translated into French, Spanish, Portuguese, German, Italian, Dutch, and Swedish. She was runner-up for the 2011 Dayton Literary Peace Prize, and a finalist for a Flaherty-Dunnan First Novel Prize, an NAACP Image Award, and an Indies Choice Book of the Year Award in Adult Debut. In 2013 she was World Literature Today’s Puterbaugh Fellow. She counts among her influences E. L. Doctorow, Toni Morrison, James Baldwin, and Edith Wharton.

Her second novel, The Shadow King (2019), is set during Mussolini's 1935 invasion of Ethiopia, shining a light on the women soldiers not usually credited in African history. Alex Clark in The Guardian said of it: "It is both a reasonably conventional narrative – there is plenty of action, detailed description and a focus spread between the principal characters – and a subtly unpredictable one. History and modernity are juxtaposed in the factual asymmetries of warfare (the Ethiopians must rely on outdated and often malfunctioning weapons and have no way of long-distance communication beyond running messengers). They are also set side by side in the modes of consciousness that all the characters experience." Michael Schaub of NPR wrote: "The importance of memory — of those that came before us, and of things we'd rather forget — is at the heart of The Shadow King.... The star of the novel, however, is Mengiste's gorgeous writing, which makes The Shadow King nearly impossible to put down. Mengiste has a real gift for language; her writing is powerful but never florid, gripping the reader and refusing to let go. And this, combined with her excellent sense of pacing, makes the book one of the most beautiful novels of the year. It's a brave, stunning call for the world to remember all who we've lost to senseless violence."

Mengiste has also been involved in human rights work. She serves on the advisory board of Warscapes, an independent online magazine that highlights current conflicts across the world, and is affiliated with the Young Center for Immigrant Children's Rights. Mengiste also serves on the Board of Directors for Words Without Borders.

Alongside Edwidge Danticat and Mona Eltahawy, Mengiste contributed a section to Richard E. Robbins's 2013 documentary film Girl Rising on girls' education around the world for 10x10 Films, with narration by Meryl Streep, Anne Hathaway, Alicia Keys, and Cate Blanchett.
 
Mengiste is currently a Professor of English at Wesleyan University. Previously, she taught in the MFA Program in Creative Writing at Queens College, City University of New York, and in the Creative Writing program at the Lewis Center for the Arts at Princeton University.

Her novel The Shadow King (2019) was shortlisted for the 2020 Booker Prize.

In January 2021, Otosirieze Obi-Young profiled her for Open Country Magazine in the cover piece of that quarter's editio of the magazine. The Piece was titled, "Maaza Mengiste is Reframing Ethiopian History."

Awards, honors, and nominations
 Fulbright Fellowship, Italy, 2010–2011
 Flaherty-Dunnan First Novel Prize, Shortlist, 2010
 Beneath the Lion's Gaze named one of The Best Books of 2010, Fiction. Christian Science Monitor, 2010
 Dayton Literary Peace Prize, Fiction Runner-up, 2011
 Beneath the Lion's Gaze named one of "The 10 Best Contemporary African Books". The Guardian, 2012
 Puterbaugh Fellow, 2013
 National Endowment for the Arts, Literature Fellowship, 2018 - Prose
 Creative Capital Award, Literary Fiction, 2019
 The Bridge Book Award - American Academy in Rome, US Embassy to Italy, Casa delle Letterature di Roma, Federazione Unitaria Italiana Scrittori, Center for Fiction - Rome, 2019
 Literaturhaus - Writers in Residence, 2020
 American Academy of Arts and Letters, Literature Award Winner, 2020
 Booker Prize Shortlist, 2020
 Edgar Awards Short Story Prize, Winner, 2021
 Premio Gregor von Rezzori, Winner, 2021 
 New York Public Library Cullman Fellow, 2021–2022

Works

Books

 Beneath the Lion's Gaze, W.W. Norton, 2010
 The Shadow King, W.W. Norton (US), 2019; Canongate (UK).
 Addis Ababa Noir, Akashic Books, 2020

Essays
 "Vanishing Virgil". Granta, November 15, 2011
 "A New 'Tizita'", Callaloo, 2011
 "The Madonna of the Sea". Granta, January 30, 2012
 "Creative Writing as Translation". Callaloo, 2012
 "The Conflicted Legacy of Meles Zenawi". Granta, 2012
 "What Makes a Real African?". The Guardian, July 7, 2013
 "We must not look away from the crises in Africa". The Guardian, July 31, 2014
 "From a Shrinking Place". The New Inquiry, November 25, 2014
 "Sudden Flowers". The New Yorker, February 4, 2015
 "Fiction Tells a Truth That History Cannot". Guernica, November 2, 2015
 "Unheard-of Things".  The Massachusetts Review (57:1), 2016
 "Primo Levi at the United Nations: Maaza Mengiste". Primo Levi Center, Printed_Matter, May 6, 2016
 "Bending History". Nka: Journal of Contemporary African Art (38–39), November 2016
 "How 'S-Town' Fails Black Listeners". Rolling Stone (April 13) 2017
 "I Want My Work to Exist in the Memories of People". Anxy Magazine (3), 2018
 "Foreword". In Vintage Addis Ababa, Ayaana Publishing, 2018
 "This is What the Journey Does". In The Displaced: Refugee Writers on Refugee Living, Abrams Books, 2018
 "In Ethiopia's Highlands, a Search for Hope and Horror". Wall Street Journal, August 20, 2019
 "Writing About the Forgotten Black Women of the Italo-Ethiopian War". Literary Hub, September 24, 2019
 "From Homer to Alexievich: Top 10 books about the human cost of war", The Guardian, January 29, 2020

References

General references
Biography in Anita Theorell, Afrika har ordet (2010), Nordiska Afrikainstitutet, .

External links 

Official website
"Emerging from the Shadows of History: A Conversation with Maaza Mengiste" at World Literature Today, March 2014
 Webcast at the Library of Congress, March 21, 2013
 Eleanor Wachtel, "An Interview with Maaza Mengiste", Brick, 106, December 5, 2020.

1971 births
21st-century American novelists
21st-century American women writers
American women academics
American women novelists
Ethiopian emigrants to the United States
Ethiopian novelists
Ethiopian women writers
Living people
New York University alumni
Novelists from New Jersey
Novelists from New York (state)
People from Addis Ababa
Princeton University faculty
Queens College, City University of New York faculty